Tropical Storm Gil had caused squally weather off the eastern coast of Mexico. Gil was a tropical cyclone that had produced high winds and severe weather in Mexico before drifting off at sea. Gil developed off a tropical wave that had gone through the Atlantic and into the Pacific. The wave had emerged off the eastern Pacific on August 27, two days prior to Gil's formation. The tropical wave had an abundant convection system. On the August 29, Tropical Depression 10-E. Six hours later, the storm developed into a tropical storm and was designated as Tropical Storm Gil.

Heavy rainfall was reported in the state of Sinaloa. The storm left one 14 year-old missing at Culiacán, who according to witnesses, had been washed away. The 14 year-old's name was Jesús Enrique Campos Medina, and was later found and saved by the fire department on August 30. Gil had also brought 1 meter high floods. The storm had ventured out at sea for the next 2 days before degenerating into a remnant low.

Meteorological history 

A tropical wave emerged off of Africa on August 16, 2007 and headed east towards the Atlantic. As the storm headed west, the wave interacted with a large upper-level trough centered over the eastern Caribbean Sea. The wave continued westward across the Caribbean Sea and Central America, and the northern portion of the wave spawned a weak low pressure area in the Bay of Campeche on the 26th of August. Most of the convective activity associated with the southern portion of the wave continued westward over Mexico. The wave emerged over the eastern North Pacific on 27 August, and the shower activity became concentrated just south of Cabo Corrientes, Mexico. The wave continued westward and became better organized as it developed additional thunderstorms with a few convective bands.

On 12:00 UTC on the 29th of August, Tropical Depression 10-E formed with wind speeds up to 11 kn (34.5 mph). The tropical depression was 240 nmi south-southeast of the southern tip of Baja California. The National Oceanic and Atmospheric Administration had noted that the depression had continued to organize it's deep convection during the day.

At 18:00 UTC, the depression had wind speeds over 39 mph, therefore had developed into a tropical storm. The storm was designated as Tropical Storm Gil. While forming, the storm had brought thunderstorms and floods up to 1 meter high to Western Mexico, specifically Sinaloa.

Tropical Storm Gil had attained peak winds reached only 40 knots and a minimum pressure of 1001 mbar at August 30 at 12:00 UTC. Thereafter, Gil experienced a period of weakening due to both shear and the cooler waters of the Pacific. The cooler waters induced a weakening which lead Tropical Storm Gil degenerating into a remnant low on September 2 at 15:00 UTC. Gil dissipated into the cool waters of the Pacific at 06:00 UTC on September 2.

Impact 

Although the storm never made landfall as a tropical storm, it did bring squally weather and flooding to Mexico, mainly the state of Baja California Sur and the state of Sinaloa. Jesús Enrique Campos Medina, a 14 year old boy, got caught in the flooding in his hometown of Culiacán by the wind and downpours of Tropical Storm Gil. He was found by the local fire department in a sewer.

In some instances, flooding heights were reported to be up to 1.5 meters high in Culiacán. In Culiacán, around 100 vehicles were stranded in sectors such as Las Quintas, the city center and Chapultepec, causing severe road congestion. The shuttle service had to be suspended for two hours. Jams were frequently seen in the road.

In some urban areas, the water reached one meter in height and in neighborhoods in the north of Culiacán, such as Humaya, Cuauhtémoc and the Issstesin subdivision, dozens of families were evicted by Civil Protection personnel and municipal police.

See also 

 Hurricane Gil (1983)
 Tropical Storm Gil
 2007 Pacific hurricane season

References 

Gil
2007 in Mexico